Prince Masvaure (born 7 October 1988) is a Zimbabwean first-class cricketer. In July 2016 he was named in Zimbabwe's Test squad for their series against New Zealand. On 28 July 2016 he made his Test debut for Zimbabwe against New Zealand.

He was the leading run-scorer for Mid West Rhinos in the 2017–18 Pro50 Championship tournament, with 271 runs in eight matches.

In June 2018, he was named in a Board XI team for warm-up fixtures ahead of the 2018 Zimbabwe Tri-Nation Series. Later the same month, he was named in a 22-man preliminary Twenty20 International (T20I) squad for the tri-nation series. He made his One Day International (ODI) debut for Zimbabwe against Pakistan on 18 July 2018.

In December 2020, he was selected to play for the Rhinos in the 2020–21 Logan Cup. In January 2022, during the 2021–22 Logan Cup, Masvaure played in his 100th first-class match.

References

External links
 

1988 births
Living people
Zimbabwean cricketers
Zimbabwe Test cricketers
Zimbabwe One Day International cricketers
Mashonaland cricketers
Southern Rocks cricketers
Mid West Rhinos cricketers
Northerns (Zimbabwe) cricketers
Sportspeople from Bulawayo